Wearhead railway station served the village of Wearhead, County Durham, England, from 1895 to 1961 on the Weardale Railway.

History 
The station opened on 21 October 1895 by the North Eastern Railway. It was situated on the north side of Front Street on the A689. It had a signal box, a goods warehouse and a single road engine shed, situated to the southeast. The station closed to passengers on 29 June 1953 and closed to goods on 2 January 1961. The road at the engine shed was lifted shortly after and the shed was demolished after 1977. The platform and the station building still exist, in use as a private residence.

References

External links 

Disused railway stations in County Durham
Former North Eastern Railway (UK) stations
Railway stations opened in 1895
Railway stations closed in 1953
1895 establishments in England
1961 disestablishments in England
Stanhope, County Durham
Railway stations in Great Britain opened in the 19th century